Inland Fisheries Ireland (IFI) is a state agency responsible for fisheries management of freshwater fish and coastal fish with 12 nautical miles of the shore. A separate agency, Bord Iascaigh Mhara, is responsible for sea fisheries. IFI's mission statement is "To ensure the valuable natural resources of Inland Fisheries and Sea Angling are conserved, managed, developed and promoted in their own right to generate a positive return for the community and the environment".

Statutory history
Inland and coastal fishing rights are a form of private property. The Fisheries (Ireland) Act 1842 established regional Boards of Conservators for regulation and conservation. In 1951 Iontaobhas Iascaigh Intíre Ioncorportha (the Inland Fisheries Trust Incorporated) was established for publicly owned fisheries. The Fisheries Act 1980 established a Central Fisheries Board, which replaced Iontaobhas Iascaigh Intíre and the Boards of Conservators. The Inland Fisheries Act 2010 established Inland Fisheries Ireland as a replacement for the Central Fisheries Board. The restructure was partly a cost-saving rationalisation in line with Ireland's post-2008 austerity measures, and partly a shift of emphasis from economic exploitation towards environmental stewardship.

Structure
There are six river basin districts, each with a separate IFI office: Eastern (office in Dublin); South Eastern (Clonmel); South Western (Macroom); Shannon River (Limerick); Western (Galway and Ballina) and North Western (Ballyshannon).

References

External links
 
 Inland Fisheries Act 2010 as amended to 1 March 2018, from the Law Reform Commission's revised statues site

2010 establishments in Ireland
Fishing in Ireland
Environment of the Republic of Ireland
State-sponsored bodies of the Republic of Ireland
Department of Agriculture, Food and the Marine
Fisheries protection
Seanad nominating bodies